The Broxton, Hazlehurst and Savannah Railroad was chartered in 1900 and operated a  line between Broxton and Hazlehurst, Georgia, USA.  It lasted until 1905 when it merged with the Ocilla and Valdosta Railroad.

Defunct Georgia (U.S. state) railroads
Railway companies established in 1900
Railway companies disestablished in 1905
1900 establishments in Georgia (U.S. state)
American companies disestablished in 1905